Nadia is a district in the state of West Bengal, India. It borders Bangladesh to the east, North 24 Parganas and Hooghly districts to the south, Purba Bardhaman to the west, and Murshidabad to the north.

Nadia district is highly influential in the cultural history of Bengal. The standard version of Bengali, developed in the 19th century, is based on the dialect spoken around Nadia. Known as the "Oxford of Bengal", Nabadwip made many contributions to Indian philosophy, such as the Navya-Nyaya system of logic and is the birthplace of the Vaishnava saint Chaitanya Mahaprabhu. The district is still largely agricultural.

Etymology 
"Nadia" is a shortened form of Nabadwip, the name for a historic city in the district. Nabadwip, literally "new island", was formerly an island created by alluvial deposits of the Ganga.

Geography 
Nadia district is located in southern West Bengal, in the west-central Bengal region. The district is largely alluvial plain, formed by the constant shifting of the various rivers of the Ganges Delta. To the west of the district is the Bhagirathi (or Hooghly) river, which was once the main distributary of the Ganga towards the Bay of Bengal, and is still considered to be the continuation of the Ganga for Hindus. As the main flow of the Ganga flowed east into the Padma, the Bhagirathi largely dried up. Most of the rivers now flowing through Nadia now have little water in them. Nearly all the district has been converted into farmland.

Rivers 
Nadia district is home to many rivers. The Padma, now the main distributary of the Ganga, touches the district on its northeastern end.

The Jalangi, which flows from Murshidabad district, forms much of the northwestern border of the district with Murshidabad, before flowing south into Nadia district. Around Krishnanagar, it turns west and flows into the Bhagirathi near Nabadwip.

The Mathabhanga originates in the far northeast of the district and forms part of the border with Bangladesh. It then flows into Bangladesh until again forming part of the border enters the district again at Gede. At Maijdia, it splits into the Churni and Ichamati. The Churni flows southwest and merges with the Bhagirathi at Shibpur near Ranaghat. The Ichamati flows into Bangladesh near Mubarakpur and reenters India near Duttaphulia. It then flows south into North 24 Parganas district.

History
Nabadwip, an ancient town within Nadia district, is often referred to as the “Oxford of Bengal". Chaitanya Mahaprabhu was born in Nabadwip. One of the Indian schools of logic (Tarka sastra) called Navya Nyaya system was developed in Nabadwip, which produced great logicians in the 15th century. Nabadwip was an important seat of political power and the capital of Bengal under Ballal Sen and later Lakshman Sen, kings of the Sena Empire, who ruled from 1159 to 1206. In 1202, Nabadwip was captured by Bakhtiyar Khilji. This victory paved the way for Muslim rule in Bengal. The British defeated Siraj ud-Daulah, Nawab of Bengal, at Palashi in this district. The 1859 revolt against European Indigo planters started from the village of Chaugacha in Krishnanagar, Nadia. Nadia is thought to have had trade relations with Tibet, Nepal and Bhutan.

Pre-independence Nadia had five subdivisions: Krishnagar sadar, Ranaghat, Kushtia, Meherpur and Chuadanga. Due to some cartographic error in 1947, large part of Nadia except Nabadwip initially were included into East Pakistan (now Bangladesh). Due to protests rectification was made and on the night of August 17, 1947, Ranaghat, Krishnanagar, Shikarpur in Karimpur and Plassey were placed in India. Since then some parts of this district have been celebrating Independence day on August 17 and August 18.

Governance

District Administration
The District of Nadia has its headquarter at Krishnanagar town. The British district of Nadia was formed in 1787. The present district of Nadia after partition was formed by Notification No.545-GA dated 23 February 1948. The District Administration is headed by the District Magistrate & District Collector, Nadia.

Administrative subdivisions
The district comprises four subdivisions: Krishnanagar Sadar, Kalyani, Ranaghat and Tehatta. Krishnanagar is the district headquarters. There are 19 police stations, 2 women's and 1 cyber crime police stations, 17 community development blocks, 11 municipalities, 187 gram panchayats (3114 sets) and 2639 villages in this district.

Other than municipality area, each subdivision contains community development blocks which in turn are divided into rural areas and census towns. In total there are 26 urban units: 9 municipalities and 15 census towns and two notified areas. Ranaghat, Aistala, Satigachha, Nasra and Cooper's Camp together forms Ranaghat urban agglomeration. Nabadwip, Char Maijdia and Char Brahmanagar forms Nabadwip UA. Chakdaha, Gopalpur and Parbbatipur forms Chakdaha UA. Krishnanagar and Badkulla together forms Krishnanagar UA. Birnagar, Phulia and Taherpur together forms Birnagar UA.

Assembly constituencies
The district is divided into 17 assembly constituencies, which are part of four Lok Sabha constituencies.

Demographics

According to the 2011 census Nadia district has a population of 5,167,600, roughly equal to the US state of Colorado. This gives it a ranking of 18th in India (out of a total of 640). Its population growth rate over the decade 2001-2011 was 12.24%. Nadia has a sex ratio of 947 females for every 1000 males, and a literacy rate of 75.58%. Scheduled Castes and Scheduled Tribes make up 29.93% and 2.72% of the population respectively. Bengali is the predominant language, spoken by 98.02% of the population.

Religion 

As per the 2011 Census, Hinduism is the majority religion of the district, followed by 72.15% of the population. Hinduism became majority in the district after Independence, when Nadia became the destination for millions of refugees from East Pakistan, and from Bangladesh after 1971.

Over 90% of Muslims live in rural areas. Muslims are majority in Karimpur II (60.38%), Kaliganj (58.51%), Nakashipara (53.06%), and Chapra (59.72%) CD blocks. Muslims are a significant minority in Tehatta II (49.89%), Krishnanagar II (42.84%), and Nabadwip (38.20%).

Flora and fauna

Education

University
 Bidhan Chandra Krishi Viswavidyalaya 
 Kalyani University 
 Indian Institute of Science Education and Research, Kolkata
 Maulana Abul Kalam Azad University of Technology
 West Bengal University of Animal and Fishery Sciences
 All India Institute of Medical Sciences, Kalyani
 National Institute of Biomedical Genomics

College
 Tehatta Government College, Tehatta
 Kaliganj Government College, Debagram
 Karimpur Pannadevi College, Karimpur
 Srikrishna College, Bagula
 Sudhiranjan Lahiri Mahavidyalaya, Majhdia
 Santipur College, Santipur
 Indian Institute of Handloom Technology, Fulia 
 Industrial Training Institute, Fulia
 Ranaghat College, Ranaghat
 Ranaghat Government Polytechnic, Ranaghat
 Nabadwip Vidyasagar College, Nabadwip
 Krishnagar Government College, Krishnanagar
 Krishnagar Women's College, Krishnanagar
 Haringhata Mahavidyalaya, Haringhata
 Dwijendralal College, Krishnanagar
 Dr. B.R. Ambedkar College, Betai
 Chakdaha College, Chakdaha
 Plassey College, Plassey
 Pritilata Waddedar Mahavidyalaya, Panikhali
 Bipradas Pal Chowdhury Institute of Technology, Krishnanagar
 Asannagar Madan Mohan Tarkalankar College, Asannagar
 Bethuadahari College, Bethuadahri
 Chapra Bangaljhi Mahavidyalaya, Chapra
 Chapra Government College, Chapra
 Muragacha Government College, Muragachha
 Kalyani Mahavidyalaya, Kalyani
 Kalyani Government Engineering College, Kalyani
 College of Medicine & JNM Hospital, Kalyani

Private College
 JIS College of Engineering, Kalyani
 Ideal Institute of Engineering, Kalyani

Transport

Rail
 Nabadwip Dham is 65 km from Bandel, 105 km from Howrah and 112 km from Sealdah on the Bandel-Katwa-Azimganj (B.A.K Loop Line) section of Eastern Railway. It has three Railway Stations as Nabadwip Dham railway station (NDAE), Bishnupriya (VSPR) of Howrah Division and Nabadwip Ghat (NDF) of Sealdah Division.
 Krishnanagar City Junction is 100 km from Sealdah on the Sealdah-Lalgola Section of Eastern Railway.
 Kalinarayanpur Junction is 78 km from Sealdah on the Sealdha-Lalgola section of Eastern Railway.
 Ranaghat Junction is 74 km from Sealdah on the Sealdah-Lalgola Section of Eastern Railway.

Notable people

 Satyendra Nath Bose, Indian mathematician and physicist specializing in theoretical physics
 Jagadananda Roy, Science Fiction writer. 
 Basanta Kumar Biswas, independence revolutionary 
 Dwijendralal Ray, poet, playwright and lyricist
 Chaitanya Mahaprabhu, Bengali Hindu mystic, saint, proponent of Bhakti yoga and Achintya Bheda Abheda philosophy
 Krittibas Ojha, medieval Bengali poet
 Soumitra Chatterjee, actor, dramatist
 Rakhee Gulzar, actress.
 Jhulan Goswami, cricketer
 Ramtanu Lahiri, social reformer
 Bagha Jatin, Bengali revolutionary
 Lalon Shah, Sufi saint, philosopher, social reformer
 Bikash Roy, Indian actor and filmmaker
 Subhash Mukhopadhyay, poet
 Sudhir Chakraborty, educator
 Jyotirmoyee Sikdar, athlete
 Azizul Haque (educator), advocate, diplomat
 Soma Biswas, athlete
 Ujjwal Maulik, Professor and computer scientist
 Hemanta Kumar Sarkar, philologist, author, leader of Freedom Movement
 Dr. Sudhir Chakraborty, educationist and essayist
 Mohammad Mozammel Huq, poet, journalist
 Gopal Bhar, courtier and jester
 Jatindramohan Bagchi, poet, editor
 Narayan Sanyal, writer and civil engineer
 Asim Duttaroy, a Medical Scientist
 Qazi Motahar Hossain, polymath, author, scientist, statistician, chess player, and journalist.

Notes

References

External links

 
Districts of West Bengal
Minority Concentrated Districts in India